Percomorpha is a large clade of ray-finned fish that includes the tuna, seahorses, gobies, cichlids, flatfish, wrasse, perches, anglerfish, and pufferfish.

Evolution
Percomorpha are the most diverse group of teleost fish today. Teleosts, and percomorphs in particular, thrived during the Cenozoic era. Fossil evidence shows that there was a major increase in size and abundance of teleosts immediately after the mass extinction event at the Cretaceous-Paleogene boundary ca. 65 Ma ago.

Phylogeny

External relationships
The two cladograms below are based on Betancur-R et al., 2017. Percomorphs are a clade of teleost fishes. The first cladogram shows the interrelationships of percomorphs with other living groups of teleosts.

Internal relationships
The following cladogram shows the evolutionary relationships of the various groups of extant percomorph fishes:

References

 
Vertebrate unranked clades